The Hard Mobile Launcher (HML) is a mobile radiation-hardened truck transporter erector launcher designed to facilitate the transport and launching of the MGM-134 Midgetman missile.

Overview

It can travel at speeds of up to 55 mph on the road and it also has off-road capabilities. The vehicle also has a trailer mounted plow which can be used to dig the launcher into the earth in order to help protect it were it within the vicinity of a nuclear detonation.

The vehicle weighs a total of 108,400 kg (239,000 pounds), with a length of over 33.5m (110 feet) and it has the capability to transport objects weighing up to 36,300 kg (80,000 pounds). It is powered by a Rolls-Royce Perkins diesel engine which produces 1200 hp and controls all 8 wheels using an electro-hydraulic transmission.

Design and testing
Two teams were assigned to develop a vehicle. 

Caterpillar developed a tracked tractor (Mobil-Trac System) while Martin Marietta was the system integrator and also built the Mobility Test Bed missile trailer.

A second team consisting of Boeing Aerospace and Electronics' Loral Defense Systems Division (Goodyear Aerospace) built an eight wheel drive vehicle and trailer. 

The Air Force selected the Boeing-Loral prototype. Several vehicles were delivered to the US Air Force by December 1986. The Air Force tested the vehicle until 1991, after which development of the MGM-134 missile project ceased, leading to the project's cancellation.

NMUSAF Museum acquisition
Following the cancellation of the MGM-134 missile project, the last of the engineering models was acquired by the National Museum of the U.S. Air Force in Ohio in 1992. It is no longer on display and was given to the Defense Reutilization and Marketing Office.

The Hard Mobile Launcher at Wright Patterson Air Force Base was sold for scrap in July 2015.  The lot number was 5650, the auction event ID was 40039.  The event notice is still online as of October 2017.  It was broken up in September 2015.

References

Intercontinental ballistic missiles of the United States
Missile launchers
Eight-wheel drive
Tracked military vehicles